Eleonora Soldo (born 17 January 1984) is an Italian road and track racing cyclist.

Soldo won in 2003, 2004 and 2005 different medals at European Track Cycling Championships for under-23, including a gold in the scratch in 2004.

References

External links

1984 births
Italian track cyclists
Italian female cyclists
Living people
Place of birth missing (living people)